Zubin is a Persian male given name, which literally means "something that touches the sky" and commonly refers to a type of short spear in Persian. In Persian mythology, Zubin (also called: Zupin, Zhubin, Zhupin) was a legendary Persian warrior famous for his courage and military command, lending to the meaning of "the man who touched the sky." Zubin also meant "weapon," generally referring to "a short spear [that is] thrown to kill the enemy commander." Variants of the name include Chubin (چوبین), Joubin (ژوبین), Jubin, Zubeen, and Zhubin.

The name Zubin may refer to:
(as a given name)
Zubin Mehta (born 1936), Indian conductor
Zubin Varla (born 1970), British actor and singer
Zubin Damania (born 1973), American physician, comedian, internet personality, musician, and founder of Turntable Health.
Zubin Garg (born 1972), Indian musician and actor
Zubin Nautiyal, Indian Singer
Zubin Surkari (born 1980), Canadian cricketer
Zubin Sedghi (born 1984), Persian-American neuroscientist and bassist
Zubin Salimi Pahlavi (born 1977), Persian Prince, is a member of the deposed Pahlavi dynasty of Iran.

(as a surname)
Emil Zubin (born 1977), Slovenian footballer
Joseph Zubin (1900–1990) American psychologist

(place name)
Zubin Potok in North Kosovo

see also:
Joseph Zubin Award
The Zubin Foundation

References

External links
Persian language reference

Persian masculine given names